Akash Budha Magar (born 14 February 2002) is a Nepalese professional footballer who plays as a midfielder for Martyr's Memorial A-Division League club Satdobato Youth Club and the Nepal national team. He made his international national debut against Mauritius on 29 January 2022 in Kathmandu.

References 

2002 births
Living people
Nepalese footballers
Nepal youth international footballers
Nepal international footballers
Association football midfielders